In photography and cinematography, a normal lens is a lens that reproduces a field of view that appears "natural" to a human observer. In contrast, depth compression and expansion with shorter or longer focal lengths introduces noticeable, and sometimes disturbing, distortion.

The problem 
Photographic technology employs different physical methods from the human eye in order to capture images. Thus, manufacturing optics which produce images that appear natural to human vision is problematic.

The eye has a nominal focal length of approximately 17mm, but it varies with accommodation. The nature of human binocular vision, which uses two lenses instead of a single one, and post-processing by the cortex is very different from the process of making and rendering a photograph, video or film.

The structure of the human eye has a concave retina, rather than a flat sensor. This produces effects observed by Abraham Bosse, who in his 1665 illustration 'To prove that one can neither define nor paint as the eye sees', demonstrates how the circular projection of the visual cone conflicts with the flat plane of the picture surface, prompting continued debate over whether straight lines in the world are perceived as straight or curved in a form of barrel distortion, and whether they should be depicted as straight in the picture plane.

Helmholtz's (1910) pin-cushioned chessboard figure demonstrates that straight lines in the world are not always perceived as straight and, conversely, that curved lines in the world can sometimes be seen as straight.

The retina also has variable sensitivity across its wider-than-180° horizontal field-of-view and ranging in resolution in peripheral or foveal vision.

Given the lack of a clear correlation between human vision and camera lenses, explanations in photography texts to account for this rule's efficacy tend to gloss over or merely restate the phenomenon, claiming that using 50mm lenses "approximates the angle of view and magnification of human vision", or that "the normal focal length for a given format most closely approximates human sight, and projects an image with the least distortion and compression of space from foreground to background", or that "the perspective is correct and we are most comfortable with a picture captured with a 50-mm lens".

What is 'normal'? 
A test of what is a normal lens then, is to find one that renders a printed (or otherwise displayed) photograph of a scene that when held at 'normal' viewing distance (usually arm's length) in front of the original scene and viewed with one eye, matches the real-world and the rendered perspective, though Maurice Pirenne (in 1970) and others demonstrate that it is possible to see a scene made with any lens in normal perspective if one adjusts the viewing distance; but impractically close to the image for wide angle photographs and further away for a telephoto, and views it from a static point at the centre of perspective from which the image was made, supporting the observations of perspective paintings made by Leonardo da Vinci.

The image circle 
A normal lens typically has an angle of view that is close to one radian (~57.296˚) of the optical system's image circle. For 135 format (24 x 36 mm), with an escribed image circle diameter equal to the diagonal of the frame (43.266 mm), the focal length that has an angle of one radian of the inscribed circle is 39.6 mm; the focal length that has an angle of one radian of the horizontally-bound inscribed image circle, is 33 mm; the focal length that has an angle of one radian of the vertically-bound inscribed circle, is 22 mm. This correlates with the popularity of 35 and 24 mm lenses, and the existence of 40mm lenses, albeit the latter in a more restrained offer. A 50 mm lens has a vertical-bound inscribed circle angle of view of ~0.5 radians. A 70mm focal length has a horizontally-bound inscribed circle angle of view of ~0.5 radians. An 85 mm lens has an enscribed (frame diagonal) circle angle of view of ~0.5 radians. Effectively, the 24, 35 and 40 mm trio have a 1:2 relation to the 50, 70 and 85 trio of focal lengths. "Normal" lenses, those that cover one radian in at least one of their inscribed or escribed image circles, belong to the first group, with 35 and 40 mm lenses closer to one radian than 50mm lenses.

Perspective effects of short or long focal-length lenses 
Lenses with longer or shorter focal lengths produce an expanded or contracted field of view that appears to distort the perspective when viewed from a normal viewing distance. Lenses of shorter focal length are called wide-angle lenses, while longer-focal-length lenses are referred to as long-focus lenses (with the most common of that type being the telephoto lenses). Superimposing a wide-angle image print against the original scene would require holding it closer to the eye, while the telephoto image would need to be placed well into the depth of the photographed scene, or a tiny print to be held at arm's length, to match their perspectives.

Such is the extent of distortions of perspective with these lenses that they may not be permitted as legal evidence.

The ICP Encyclopaedia of Photography notes that for legal purposes: "Judges will not admit a picture that seems to have been tampered with or that distorts any aspect of the scene [or does not render a normal perspective]...That is, the size relationships of objects in the photograph should be equivalent to what they actually are."

'Normal' lenses vary for different formats 
For still photography, a lens with a focal length about equal to the diagonal size of the film or sensor format is considered to be a normal lens; its angle of view is similar to the angle subtended by a large-enough print viewed at a typical viewing distance equal to the print diagonal; this angle of view is about 53° diagonally. For cinematography, where the image is larger relative to viewing distance, a wider lens with a focal length of roughly a quarter of the film or sensor diagonal is considered 'normal'. The term normal lens can also be used as a synonym for rectilinear lens. This is a completely different use of the term.

Typical normal focal lengths for different formats

Film still

Typical normal lenses for various film formats for photography are:

For a 35mm camera with a diagonal of 43mm, the most commonly used normal lens is 50mm, but focal lengths between about 40 and 58mm are also considered normal. The 50mm focal length was chosen by Oskar Barnack, the creator of the Leica camera. 

Note that the angle of view also depends on the aspect ratio. For example, a "normal" lens on 35mm does not have the same view as a "normal" lens on 645.

Digital still
In digital photography, the sensor "type" is not the sensor diameter:
 (*) refers to TV tube diameters that were standards in the 50s. The normal lens focal length is roughly 2/3 of the TV tube diameter.
 (**) this is a mathematical calculation because most of the cameras are equipped with zoom lenses.

Cinema
In cinematography, a focal length roughly equivalent to twice the diagonal of the image projected within the camera is considered normal, since movies are typically viewed from a distance of about twice the screen diagonal.

See also
Optics
Distortion
Perception
Visual perception
Lens design

References

Photographic lenses
Perspective projection
Imaging